Vice admiral (VAdm) (Vam) is a three-star commissioned naval officer rank in the Swedish Navy. Vice admiral ranks above rear admiral and below admiral. Vice admiral is equivalent to the rank of lieutenant general.

History
In Sweden, the admiral's rank first appeared during the reign of Gustav I, who in 1522 gave it to Erik Fleming, a Council of the Realm. During Gustav's reign as king and throughout the latter part of the 16th century, the highest command of a fleet was led by a översteamiral ("colonel admiral"), to whose assistant a underamiral was appointed. It was not until 1569 that a permanent översteamiral was appointed; In 1602 the title was exchanged for riksamiral ("Admiral of the Realm"). The first permanent underamiral was appointed in 1575; his office ceased in 1619. Vice admiral is first mentioned in 1577. The admirals of the Swedish Navy have, incidentally, been as follows: generalamiral ("general admiral"), amiralgeneral ("admiral general"), storamiral ("grand admiral"), överamiral, riksviceamiral ("Vice Admiral of the Realm"), amiralgenerallöjtnant ("admiral lieutenant general"), amirallöjtnant ("lieutenant admiral"), schoutbynacht and konteramiral ("rear admiral"). Vice admirals were in ancient times called lieutenant admirals. Between 1680 and 1771, vice admiral ranked between admiral and schoutbynacht. It was then replaced by rear admiral.

When the vice admiral was commander of the squadrons, he carried the Swedish naval ensign with two white stars in the lower blue field as a sign of command. Vice admiral is equivalent to the rank of lieutenant general in the Swedish Army, the Swedish Air Force, the Swedish Coastal Artillery (until 2000) and as well as in the Swedish Amphibious Corps (from 2000). Historically, the Chief of the Navy (1936–1994) and the Chief of Navy Staff (1994–1998) positions was a flag officer with the rank of vice admiral. Historically, during the 20th century, vice admirals were promoted one grade upon retirement to full four-star admiral. The last time this happened was in 1991 when vice admiral Bror Stefenson was promoted to admiral in connection with his retirement from the navy. According to current practice only royals and the Supreme Commander of the Swedish Armed Forces, if he were to come from the Swedish Navy, can hold the rank of a full, four-star, admiral in Sweden.

Following a proposal from the Swedish Armed Forces, the Government of Sweden decides on employment as a vice admiral.

In everyday speech, vice admirals are addressed as admirals.

Uniform

Shoulder mark
The shoulder mark of a Swedish vice admiral contains a 45 mm galloon m/51 and three 25 mm star m/30 in silver embroidery on a white background: The center distance between the stars on the shoulder mark must be 27 mm.

Sleeve insignia
A flag officer wears on the sleeves a 45 mm galloon (GALON M/51 45MM K) and a rank insignia (GRADBETECKNING M/02 TILL ÄRM FLOTTAN) (round loop, the Amphibious Corps has a pointed loop in form of a grenade).

Hats

Peaked cap
A flag officer wears as embellishments a gold embroidered oak leaf wreath (known as scrambled egg) on the visor of the peaked cap (skärmmössa m/48). It also fitted with a hat badge (mössmärke m/78 off för flottan) and with a strap in form of a golden braid.

Side cap and winter hat
An officer wears a hat badge (mössmärke m/78 off) for the navy and another (mössmärke m/87 off) for amphibious units on the side cap (båtmössa m/48) and on the winter hat (vintermössa m/87).

Personal flags
Admiral's command flag, which admirals of all ranks carry on ships, where they are as commanders. On a three-masted ship, a vice admiral's flag flies on the top of the fore-mast (admiral's flies on top of the main mast and rear admiral's on top of the mizzen-mast). The command flag of a vice admiral (and a lieutenant general) is a double swallowtailed Swedish flag. In the first blue field 3 five-pointed white stars placed one over two (before 1972 by two in the same place).

The flag of the vice admiral (and admiral and rear admiral) is flown on ships of the navy, from which officer of the rank now mentioned exercises his command, or on which he travels in the service, but not on ships on which he is in the capacity of exercise leader.

A flag officer (for example vice admiral) who holds the position of Supreme Commander, Chief of Operations, Chief of Navy, Chief of Maritime Component Command or naval force commander, may carry an admiral flag on a car in which the commander in question travels in uniform. On airplanes/helicopters, vice admirals (flag officers) may carry a command sign in the form of an image of an admiral flag.

Gun salute
When raising or lowering flags of the commander's, squadron, department or division commander, a gun salute is given with 15 rounds for vice admiral (17 for admiral and 13 for rear admiral).

List of vice admirals

The following people have held the rank of vice admiral in the Swedish Navy from 1900–present:

Footnotes

References

Notes

Print

 
Military ranks of the Swedish Navy
Three-star officers